Cambuslang railway station is a railway station which serves the town of Cambuslang, South Lanarkshire, Scotland. Passenger services are provided by ScotRail Trains on behalf of Strathclyde Partnership for Transport (SPT).

History 
The station was planned as part of the Clydesdale Junction Railway, opening on 1 June 1849 between Motherwell and Rutherglen along what had become part of the Caledonian Railway. In 1974, the West Coast Main Line electrification was completed by British Rail with local services through the station on the Hamilton Circle and Lanark routes converted to electric trains operated using BR Class 303 and 311 "Blue Trains".

The station originally had two large station buildings on each platform, leading directly up to the Main Street; these were later demolished, and one building has been built on the street containing the ticket office and timetable posters.

Geography 
The platforms of Cambuslang are located in a cutting between North Avenue and Cambuslang Main Street. The station falls within the G72 postcode area; the main entrance is from Cambuslang Main Street. There is also a secondary (non-wheelchair accessible) entrance from North Avenue. The station is approximately 5 minutes' walk from the nearby Morrisons supermarket. There is an SPT bus stance outside the station, served by First Bus and Henderson Travel services to Buchanan Bus Station and to Parkhead Forge. In 2022 a large Park and Ride facility had been opened on Bridge Street - about 2-3 minute walk across the Main Street

Operations

Platform 1 – Westbound 
Westbound services travel towards . Shotts Line services terminate at the High Level platforms, as did the Hamilton Circle services prior to the opening of the Argyle Line in November 1979. From November 1979, British Rail electric services proceeded through the Low Level platforms, to the North Clyde Line, terminating at Milngavie, Dalmuir (via Yoker or Singer).

A further recast of the timetable in December 2014 means that services from Lanark now run to High Level and passengers from this direction wishing to reach Argyle Line destinations must change trains here.  Services on the Argyle Line now run to Dalmuir via Yoker and to Milngavie.

Platform 2 – Eastbound 
Eastbound services travel from Glasgow Central. Trains on the Shotts Line proceed through to Edinburgh Waverley, but only call during the peaks and late evenings. Electric trains travel round the Hamilton Circle in an anti-clockwise direction to Motherwell/Cumbernauld or Larkhall and to Lanark (express; via Bellshill and Shieldmuir).

Services

1979 service patterns

Eastbound
2 tph from Dalmuir to Motherwell via Hamilton
1 tph from Dumbarton Central to Motherwell via Hamilton
2 tph from Dalmuir to Motherwell via Bellshill
1 tph from Dumbarton Central to Motherwell via Bellshill
1 tph from Milngavie to Lanark (express service between Glasgow Central and Motherwell)

Westbound
2 tph from Motherwell via Hamilton to Dalmuir
1 tph from Motherwell via Hamilton to Dumbarton Central
2 tph from Motherwell via Bellshill to Dalmuir
1 tph from Motherwell via Bellshill to Dumbarton Central
1 tph from Lanark to Milngavie (express service between Motherwell and Glasgow Central)

Current service patterns

Eastbound
 2tph to Larkhall via Hamilton
 2tph to Motherwell via Hamilton, with an hourly extension to Cumbernauld (except Sundays)
 2tph to Lanark via Bellshill & Motherwell (hourly only to Lanark on Sundays)

There are peak services to Shotts and onwards to Edinburgh that call here

Westbound
 2tph to Dalmuir via Yoker
 2tph to Glasgow Central High Level
 2tph to Milngavie

There are peak services from Shotts and Edinburgh that call here.

Station facilities 
Cambuslang is covered by CCTV and is completely accessible by wheelchair from the Main Street entrance. Timetables are posted on the footbridge and staff are on hand to assist passengers; real-time service information is provided by passenger information screens on the platforms. The footbridge is at street-level, and its metal sides rise to above average head-height, rendering the railway tracks invisible to anyone crossing. Access from the footbridge to platforms is via broad ramps. A ticket vending machine and new waiting shelters were recently installed on the westbound platform.

References

Notes

Sources

External links

ScotRail: Official Website
SPT: Official Website

Railway stations in South Lanarkshire
Former Caledonian Railway stations
Railway stations in Great Britain opened in 1849
SPT railway stations
Railway stations served by ScotRail
Buildings and structures in Cambuslang
1849 establishments in Scotland